Henny Garfunkel (born April 17, 1947) is an American street and portrait photographer based in New York City. Since 1993, Garfunkel has been photographing at major film festivals including Cannes, Toronto and Sundance Film Festival where she was branded its "reigning queen." She is known for her portraits of actors and directors. Her photographs have been published in The New York Times, Entertainment Weekly, BBC, Vogue and exhibited at the Museum of Modern Art.

References

External links 
 Official website
 Henny Garfunkel on MoMa
 
Henny Garfunkel on Instagram

1947 births
Living people
20th-century American photographers
American people of Russian-Jewish descent
20th-century American women photographers
21st-century American women